Gordon J. Wenham (born 1943) is a Reformed British Old Testament scholar and writer. He has authored several books about the Bible. Tremper Longman has called him "one of the finest evangelical commentators today."

Early life and education
Wenham read theology at Cambridge University, graduating in 1965 with distinction, and completed his PhD on Deuteronomy in 1970.

He has been awarded several scholarships in connection with Old Testament studies and has studied in Germany, the US, and Israel.

He is the son of John Wenham and the brother of David Wenham.

Career
Gordon studied theology at Cambridge University, and went on to do Old Testament research at King's College London. He spent time at Harvard University and in Jerusalem at the École Biblique and the Hebrew University.

He taught Old Testament in the Department of Semitic Studies of Queen's University in Belfast before moving to Cheltenham. He has held teaching positions or served as visiting lecturer at a range of institutions around the world. From 1995 to 2005, Wenham was Senior Professor of Old Testament at the University of Gloucestershire. He then moved to Trinity College, Bristol.

Works
Wenham has written a large number of articles and several books, including commentaries on Genesis, Leviticus, and Numbers, and more recently a study of Old Testament narrative ethics, Story as Torah (T & T Clark, 2000), and Exploring the Old Testament: the Pentateuch (SPCK: 2003).

References

English theologians
Academics of the University of Gloucestershire
1943 births
Living people
Staff of Trinity College, Bristol